The Sunday Mail is a Scottish tabloid newspaper published every Sunday.  It is the sister paper of the Daily Record and is owned by Reach plc.

History
In September 1999, when Editor Jim Cassidy was sacked, the paper's circulation was 767,000. Its nearest rival was the Scottish edition of the News of the World which sold around 350,000 copies at that time.

As of December 2016, the Sunday Mail had a circulation of 172,513. This decreased to 166,195 in February 2017, 159,880 in April 2017, 152,892 in July 2017 and 104,608 in March 2020.

On 12 May 2019, the Sunday Mail announced its support for the Scottish Greens in the upcoming EU elections, becoming the first major publication in Scotland to back the party, despite disagreeing with the Greens' pro-independence stance.

It should not be confused with The Mail on Sunday; the Daily Mail was unable to use the title Sunday Mail when it launched a Sunday edition in 1982 because of the Scottish paper.

Christmas issue
Christmas Day is falling on Sunday in 2022 there will instead of a normal issue a special Christmas edition of the paper on Christmas Eve Saturday December 24th.

Editors 
1973: Clive Sandground
1981: Endell Laird
1988: Noel Young
1991: Jim Cassidy
1999: Peter Cox
2000: Allan Rennie
2009: Jim Wilson
2016: Brendan McGinty

Current news and features journalists 
 Norman Silvester
 Craig McDonald
 John Ferguson (political editor)
 Julie-Anne Barnes
 Heather Greenaway
 Allan Bryce (sports editor)

Former news and features journalists 
 Marion Scott
 Charles Lavery
Andrew Gold
Angus McLeod (political editor)
Russell Findlay
 Brian Lironi (political editor)
John Nairn
Bill Aitken
Alex Scotland
Steve Dinneen
Jamie Livingstone
Noreen Barr
Andy Sannholm
Suzie Cormack
Victoria Raimes
Archie McKay
Gavin Goodwin
Nick Hunter (assistant editor)
John Finlayson

Former columnists 
Elaine C. Smith
Gerry Hassan
Gary Keown
Scott Robinson
Melanie Reid

See also 
List of newspapers in Scotland

References

External links 
 Sunday Mail homepage

Newspapers published in Scotland
Mass media in Glasgow
Sunday newspapers published in the United Kingdom
Supermarket tabloids
Newspapers published by Reach plc
1919 establishments in Scotland
Newspapers established in 1919